Tyner is an unincorporated community in Polk Township, Marshall County, Indiana. Originally named Tyner City, it is named after Thomas Tyner. He died in 1880, and is buried in the town's cemetery.

History
Tyner was originally called Tyner city, and under the latter name was platted in 1855. It was named for one of its founders, Thomas Tyner. The post office was called Tyner City from 1856 until 1894, when it was renamed Tyner.

Geography
Several of the streets of Tyner are named after the main thoroughfares in Cincinnati.

Notable people
Lambert Hillyer - film director
Lydia Knott—film actress
Scott Skiles—NBA player and coach

References

External links
Welcome to Tyner, Indiana

Unincorporated communities in Marshall County, Indiana
Unincorporated communities in Indiana
Populated places established in 1855
1855 establishments in Indiana